Aryandes (Old Iranian: Aryavanda or Arvanta, Ancient Greek: Ἀρυάνδης) was the first Achaemenid satrap of ancient Egypt between 525 BCE and 496 BCE, during the early 27th Dynasty of Egypt.

Career
When king Cambyses II defeated pharaoh Psamtik III at the battle of Pelusium (525 BCE), Egypt became a satrapy of the Achaemenid empire, and Aryandes was appointed satrap shortly after. In 522 BCE, Aryandes was overthrown in a revolt against the Achaemenid rule led by a native Egyptian pharaoh, Petubastis III. The rebellion was personally quelled by the new king Darius I during his expedition to Egypt in 518 BCE, and Aryandes was reinstated. The satrap then attempted to subjugate Libya with poor results.

Around 496 BCE, Aryandes fell out of favour with Darius I and was deposed and replaced by Pherendates. The reason for this decision is unknown, with Herodotus and later Polyaenus claiming that the satrap started minting his own silver coinage, calling it aryandic in opposition to the golden, already existing, daric, thus irritating the Persian king. This story is now considered unlikely because no aryandic has yet been found. It appears more likely that Darius had real concerns that Aryandes would declare independence for his satrapy.

References

Further reading

Achaemenid satraps of Egypt
Year of birth unknown
6th-century BC Iranian people
6th century BC in Egypt
5th-century BC Iranian people
5th century BC in Egypt
Twenty-seventh Dynasty of Egypt
Officials of Darius the Great